Jeff "Iron Fist" Tory (born August 6, 1973) is a Canadian ice hockey defenceman currently playing for HDD Olimpija Ljubljana in the Austrian Hockey League. Tory was born in Burnaby, British Columbia.

After spending three years in the University of Maine, Tory played for the Canadian National Team as well three games for the Kentucky Thoroughblades before signing with the Houston Aeros in 1997.  After two seasons he moved to the Philadelphia Phantoms for one season.  He then played ten games for the Utah Grizzlies before returning to the Aeros.

In 2001, Tory moved to the European leagues, signing with the Kassel Huskies of the Deutsche Eishockey Liga for one season.  He then spent one season with the Hamburg Freezers before spending three seasons with the DEG Metro Stars between 2003 and 2006.  He spent one more season in the DEL with ERC Ingolstadt before moving to Austria in 2007, signing for KAC in Klagenfurt.

Career statistics

Awards and honours

References

External links

1973 births
Living people
Canadian ice hockey defencemen
DEG Metro Stars players
ERC Ingolstadt players
Hamburg Freezers players
Houston Aeros (1994–2013) players
Ice hockey people from British Columbia
EC KAC players
Kassel Huskies players
Kentucky Thoroughblades players
Maine Black Bears men's ice hockey players
Penticton Panthers players
Philadelphia Phantoms players
Sportspeople from Burnaby
Canadian expatriate ice hockey players in Austria
Canadian expatriate ice hockey players in Germany
AHCA Division I men's ice hockey All-Americans